The Kinsky Horse is a Czech breed of warmblood sport horse. It was bred by the Kinsky family in the Kingdom of Bohemia, and is now one of four warmblood sport horse breeds reared in the Czech Republic, the others being the Czech Warmblood, the Slovakian Warmblood and the Moravian Warmblood. It was for many years absorbed into the Czech Warmblood; a separate stud-book was established in 2005. It is characterised by an unusual golden-yellow coat, though other colours are also seen.

History 

The Kinsky Horse was bred in the nineteenth century by members of the Kinsky family in the Kingdom of Bohemia, and was sometimes known as the Golden Horse of Bohemia. In the twentieth century it was largely absorbed into the Czech Warmblood. A separate stud-book for the breed was established in 2005.

Its conservation status was not listed by the FAO in 2007. In 2018 the population reported to DAD-IS was about 600 head, and the conservation status in 2020 was reported as "at risk".

Characteristics 

Many have a coat of a characteristic golden-yellow colour, but others may be bay, chestnut or occasionally black.

References

Further reading 
Horse and Hound article on Kinsky horses in Britain

Horse breeds
House of Kinsky
Horse breeds originating in the Czech Republic